Alex is a town in Grady County, Oklahoma, United States.  The population was 550 at the 2010 census.

History
The town, now locally pronounced Elik, bears the name of an early settler, an intermarried Chickasaw, named William Vinson Alexander whose wife, Martha, served as the first postmistress, after the post office was established in Alexander's store in December 1885. Alexander established the First State Bank on October 3, 1907.

Alex was almost destroyed on July 7, 1906, when a tornado hit the town. The business district was mostly rebuilt a year later, with a drug store, a variety store and three general stores. The Alex Tribune newspaper  was first published in 1907 and continued in business until the 1940s. The town incorporated in 1910.

Geography

Demographics

As of the census of 2010, there were 550 people living in the town.  The population density was 82 people per square mile (32/km2).  There were 289 housing units at an average density of 42 per square mile (15/km2).  The racial makeup of the town was 91.18% White, 6.30% Native American, 0.16% Asian, 0.79% from other races, and 1.57% from two or more races. Hispanic or Latino of any race were 1.89% of the population.

There were 254 households, out of which 29.9% had children under the age of 18 living with them, 56.3% were married couples living together, 11.8% had a female householder with no husband present, and 29.5% were non-families. 26.4% of all households were made up of individuals, and 14.2% had someone living alone who was 65 years of age or older. The average household size was 2.50 and the average family size was 2.97.

In the town, the population was spread out, with 27.2% under the age of 18, 8.2% from 18 to 24, 24.6% from 25 to 44, 22.7% from 45 to 64, and 17.3% who were 65 years of age or older. The median age was 38 years. For every 100 females, there were 99.7 males. For every 100 females age 18 and over, there were 88.6 males.

The median income for a household in the town was $27,353, and the median income for a family was $31,364. Males had a median income of $29,750 versus $21,563 for females. The per capita income for the town was $13,455. About 15.1% of families and 18.5% of the population were below the poverty line, including 18.7% of those under age 18 and 10.1% of those age 65 or over.

Economy
Alex is primarily a farm community. The main crops are wheat and alfalfa. Livestock raising is also important.

References

External links
 Community history
 Encyclopedia of Oklahoma History and Culture - Alex

Towns in Grady County, Oklahoma
Towns in Oklahoma